The Latvia men's national water polo team is the representative for Latvia in international men's water polo.

History
In 2014 during Baltic Water Polo Championships in Vilnius, Lithuania Latvia men's national water polo team won over Ukraine with result 14:10. It was a first Latvia's victory in international matches in 50 years.

References

Water polo
Men's national water polo teams
National water polo teams in Europe
National water polo teams by country
 
Men's sport in Latvia